Hoppla, We're Alive! is a Neue Sachlichkeit (or "New Objectivity") play by the German playwright Ernst Toller. Its second production, directed by the seminal epic theatre director Erwin Piscator in 1927, was a milestone in the history of theatre. The British playwright Mark Ravenhill based his Some Explicit Polaroids (1999) on Toller's play.

Characters

Prologue
Time: 1919

Main play
This piece takes place in many countries, eight years after the crushing of a people's uprising.
Time: 1927

Reception
According to theatre critic Eric Bentley’s book The Playwright as Thinker, when Erwin Piscator directed the premiere of Hoppla, We’re Alive! in 1927 and Frau Meller, the mother in the play, said "There’s only one thing to do: either hang one’s self  or change the world," the youthful audience burst spontaneously into the Internationale.

Hoppla, We're Alive! was one of the books burned in the infamous Nazi book burning, along with 20,000 other left-wing and Jewish books.

References

Sources
 Bentley, Eric. 1987. The Playwright as Thinker: A Study of Drama in Modern Times. Revised ed. San Diego: Harcourt, Brace, Jovanovich. .
 Pearlman, Alan Raphael, ed. and trans. 2000. Plays One: Transformation, Masses Man, Hoppla, We're Alive!. By Ernst Toller. Absolute Classics ser. London: Oberon. .

External links
There are some Toller-Texts on the Internet. Links of Helmut Schulze.
http://www.dhm.de/lemo/html/biografien/TollerErnst/index.html
Links
Eamonn Fitzgerald's Rainy Day: Prague spring
"The Tartan Online (Carnegie Mellon's Student Newspaper) Political theater: Robert Myers evaluates politics in playwrighting"
Ernst Toller Page Daily Bleed's Anarchist Encyclopedia

1927 plays
Plays by Ernst Toller
Expressionist plays
Modernist theatre